Vrádište is a village and municipality in Skalica District in the Trnava Region of western Slovakia.

History
In historical records the village was first mentioned in 1392.

Geography
The municipality lies at an altitude of 164 metres and covers an area of 4.251 km². It has a population of about 682 people.

Gallery

References

External links

 Official page
https://web.archive.org/web/20071116010355/http://www.statistics.sk/mosmis/eng/run.html 

Villages and municipalities in Skalica District